Joey "Ojo" Taylor is an American bassist, vocalist and keyboardist. He is best known for his work with the Christian rock band Undercover. He produced and was a studio musician for Nobody Special, the stage name for his brother, Pat "Nobody" Taylor.

Taylor co-owned the Brainstorm Artists International record label with songwriter and Adam Again front man, Gene Eugene. He received his MBA from the University of California, Los Angeles and MM from California State University, Fullerton. He teaches History of Rock, Artist Management, songwriting, Marketing of Recorded Music, Legal Aspects of Music Industry and Entrepreneurship at James Madison University in Harrisonburg, Virginia. He is now a self-proclaimed atheist.

Solo projects 
 Relative (as "Ojo") (1988) Broken Records

Undercover discography 
 Undercover (1982) MRS Records
 God Rules (1983) A&S Records
 Boys and Girls Renounce the World (1984) A&S Records
 Branded (1986) Blue Collar Records
 3-28-87 (live album) (1988) Broken Records
 Balance of Power (1990) Broken Records
 Devotion (1992) Brainstorm Artists International
 Forum (1994) WAL
 Live at Cornerstone 2000 (2000) Millennium 8
 I Rose Falling (2002) Galaxy21 Music

Re-releases and anthologies 
 Volume 1 (compilation of Undercover & God Rules) (1988) Broken Records 
 Volume 2 (compilation of Boys and Girls Renounce the World & Branded) (1988) Broken Records 
 Anthology Volume 1 (compilation of first four original releases) (1996) Innocent Media  
 Anthology Volume 2 (compilation of last four original releases) (1996) Innocent Media 
 Cornerstone 2000 (2002) Galaxy21 Music (re-release)

Video (DVD) 
 Instruction Through Film (cameo)

References 

American rock bass guitarists
American male bass guitarists
Living people
American agnostics
Year of birth missing (living people)